Christopher Allen Gabehart (born May 16, 1981) is an American NASCAR crew chief who currently works for Joe Gibbs Racing as the crew chief for Denny Hamlin in the No. 11 Toyota Camry in the NASCAR Cup Series, a position he has held since 2019. He had previously worked for Gibbs as a crew chief in the Xfinity Series for the team, working on the No. 19 of Brandon Jones in 2018, and the No. 20 of multiple drivers such as Hamlin, Erik Jones, Kyle Benjamin, and Ryan Preece in 2017 after a full season with Erik Jones in the same car in 2016.

Career

Driving career
Gabehart began his career in racing as a driver, starting to race go-karts at age ten in the World Karting Association. Quickly succeeding in that series, he picked up numerous national championships before competing in late model racing. He drove full-time in the ARCA/CRA Super Series in 2007 for his family team. He won the series championship, but quit driving after that season due to sponsorship and financial issues.

Crew chiefing career
Gabehart met Tom Busch, the father of NASCAR superstar Kyle Busch during his late model season in 2007, which led him to working as an engineer for Kyle Busch Motorsports' late model program and later in the Truck Series for the team. Then, Gabehart would move up to Joe Gibbs Racing in the Xfinity and Cup Series as an engineer.

2016–2018: JGR Xfinity teams
Gabehart's first crew chiefing job came in 2016, where he worked with defending Truck Series champion Erik Jones in his first and only full season in the Xfinity Series. They were in contention for the championship after a multiple-win season for the team, but lost the championship to fellow JGR driver Daniel Suárez. When Jones moved up to the Cup Series full-time in 2017, the car was driven by multiple drivers, including JGR Cup drivers Erik Jones, Hamlin and Suárez, as well as up-and-comers Kyle Benjamin and Ryan Preece. For 2018, Gabehart moved from the No. 20 to the No. 19 to crew chief Brandon Jones, who joined JGR that year from Richard Childress Racing.

2019–present: No. 11 Cup Series team
In 2019, Gabehart was assigned as the crew chief of the No. 11 driven by Denny Hamlin. Both Hamlin and Gabehart started the season by winning the 2019 Daytona 500, breaking Hamlin's 47-race winless streak. With four wins, the duo finished the season fourth in the points standings.

Gabehart and Hamlin started the 2020 season by winning their second (and Hamlin's overall third) Daytona 500. Gabehart was suspended for four races after Hamlin's car dropped a ballast prior to the start of the 2020 Coca-Cola 600. With a total of seven wins, the No. 11 team once again finished fourth in the points standings.

On May 3, 2022, Gabehart was suspended for four races due to a tire and wheel loss at Dover.

Personal life
Gabehart was born in Lafayette, Indiana, grew up in Louisville, Kentucky as a child, and returned to Indiana to attend Purdue University, graduating in 2005 with a mechanical engineering degree. He was the first member of his family to go to college. Both Gabehart's grandfather Al Straub and father Kevin inspired him to go racing, as Straub had previously been a NASCAR driver in the 1960s and 1970s and his father had competed in NASCAR-sanctioned races at his home track of Louisville Motor Speedway.

References

External links
 

Living people
People from Louisville, Kentucky
NASCAR crew chiefs
Purdue University College of Engineering alumni
1981 births